Tyrannus is a genus of large insect-eating birds, commonly known as kingbirds.
The suffix "-tyrannus" has often been used to describe other animals
Tyrannus may also refer to:

 Tyrannus, an owner of a lecture hall at Ephesus, mentioned in the biblical Acts of the Apostles (19:9)
 Tyrannus (comics), a fictional character who is a supervillain in Marvel Comics' The Incredible Hulk
 Tyrannus, a fictitious gladiator in the 2005 TV series Empire
 Tyrannus, a son of Pterelaus, king of the Taphians, in Greek mythology
 Tyrannus, a 5th-century bishop of Germanicopolis in Isauria, Asia Minor
 Darth Tyranus, a Sith Lord and a former Jedi in the prequel Star Wars trilogies, better known as Count Dooku

See also
 Tyranni
 Tyrannidae
 Tyrant (disambiguation)
 Tyranny (disambiguation)
 Taranis (disambiguation)